The olive-bellied sunbird (Cinnyris chloropygius) is a species of bird in the family Nectariniidae.
It is widely spread across African tropical rainforest.

Description
The olive-bellied sunbird is a small species, and very similar to the tiny sunbird (Cinnyris minullus) in appearance. The adult male has a metallic green head, back and throat, dark brown wings, a metallic blue rump and a black tail with a purplish-blue sheen. It has a narrow blue breast band above a wider scarlet breast patch, lemon-yellow  and an olive belly. It differs from the slightly smaller tiny sunbird in having a larger beak and no blue bars among the red breast plumage. The adult female has an olive-brown head and upper parts, dark brown wings and dark brown tail. The underparts are olive washed with yellow, and are yellower and less streaked than the tiny sunbird.

Ecology
The olive-bellied sunbird moves about singly or in pairs, or sometimes in groups of about six birds. It forages in the lower parts of the canopy, feeding on caterpillars, beetles, spiders, nectar, flowers and seeds. The male is territorial and will drive away members of its species as well as tiny sunbirds. The nest is a straggly affair formed from grasses, strips of bark and leaves, and lined with fine material. Incubation is done entirely by the female.

Status
The olive-bellied sunbird is a common species with a very wide range, and the population trend is thought to be steady. No particular threats have been identified and the International Union for Conservation of Nature has assessed the bird's conservation status as being of "least concern".

References

olive-bellied sunbird
Birds of the Gulf of Guinea
Birds of the African tropical rainforest
olive-bellied sunbird
Taxonomy articles created by Polbot